Diplectrum, commonly known as sand perches, is a genus of marine ray-finned fishes which is a member of the subfamily Serraninae of the family Serranidae, which includes the groupers and anthias. There are 12 species distributed in the western Atlantic Ocean and the eastern Pacific Ocean.

Species
The following species are classified under the genus Diplectrum:

 Diplectrum bivittatum (Valenciennes, 1828) (Dwarf sand perch)
 Diplectrum conceptione (Valenciennes, 1828) (Yellowmouth sand-perch)
 Diplectrum eumelum Rosenblatt & Johnson, 1974 (Orange-spotted sand perch)
 Diplectrum euryplectrum D.S. Jordan & Bollman, 1890 (Bighead sand perch)
 Diplectrum formosum (Linnaeus, 1766) (Sand perch)
 Diplectrum labarum Rosenblatt & Johnson, 1974 (Highfin sand perch)
 Diplectrum macropoma (Günther, 1864) (Mexican sand perch)
 Diplectrum maximum Hildebrand, 1946 (Torpedo sand perch)
 Diplectrum pacificum Meek & Hildebrand, 1925 (Inshore sand perch)
 Diplectrum radiale (Quoy & Gaimard, 1824)  (Pond perch)
 Diplectrum rostrum Bortone, 1974 (Bridled sand perch)
 Diplectrum sciurus Gilbert, 1892 (Gulf squirrelfish)

References

Serraninae
Perciformes genera